Al-Quds TV was a Palestinian satellite channel broadcast on Arab satellite Nilesat and Arabsat, which began broadcasting on November 11, 2008. The station is Pro-Palestinian editorially and is Hamas's second satellite TV channel, after Al-Aqsa TV. It is licensed in London, with offices in the Gaza Strip, West Bank, Beirut and Damascus. The Intelligence and Terrorism Information Center accused Al Quds of being a mouthpiece of Hamas.  American news agencies such as The New York Times and the Associated Press describes Al-Quds TV as "pro-Hamas."

On November 18, 2012, during Operation Pillar of Cloud, Israel bombarded the office of the Al-Quds TV station in Gaza, injuring three staff.

Shutdown
On 10 Feb 2019, Al-Quds TV shutdown due to financial issues.

References

External links
 Live streaming

Hamas
Television stations in the State of Palestine
Arabic-language television stations